is a railway station on the Sanriku Railway Company’s Rias Line located in the village of Tanohata, Iwate Prefecture, Japan.

Lines
Tanohata Station is served by the  Rias Line, and is located 127.6 rail kilometers from the terminus of the line at Sakari Station.

Station layout 
The station has one island platform. The station is staffed.

Platforms

Adjacent stations

History 
Tanohata Station opened on 1 April 1984, the same day of the privatization of the Japan National Railway (JNR) Kuji Line (which became the Sanriku Railway Company). During the 11 March 2011 Tōhoku earthquake and tsunami, much of the surrounding area was destroyed by a  tsunami, which also swept away parts of the tracks and suspending services on a portion of the Sanriku Railway.  However, the station building survived, and the portion of the line from Rikuchū-Noda to Tanohata resumed operations on 1 April 2012., and services were extended to Omoto on 6 April 2014.。The station was used as the set for the fictional “Hatano Station” in the NHK morning television drama Amachan which aired from April to September 2013. Minami-Rias Line, a portion of Yamada Line, and Kita-Rias Line constitute Rias Line on 23 March 2019. Accordingly, this station became an intermediate station of Rias Line.

Surrounding area 
 Hiraiga Post Office

See also
 List of railway stations in Japan

References

External links

  

Railway stations in Iwate Prefecture
Railway stations in Japan opened in 1984
Rias Line
Tanohata, Iwate